KBJ Architects, Inc. (KBJ) is an American architectural firm based in Jacksonville, Florida. The firm designed 17 of the city's 30 tallest buildings and "created Jacksonville's modern skyline", according to The Florida Times-Union newspaper. The firm designed the first high-rise in downtown Jacksonville, the 22-story Aetna Building, which opened in 1955. It took pride in "having the second-largest number of architects of any Florida firm", according to a 1997 article in The Florida Times-Union.

In addition to works in Jacksonville, KBJ has worked extensively throughout north and central Florida, and to a lesser degree throughout the southeast United States. Clients include international and private corporations, developers, institutions, public authorities, as well as federal, state, and local governments. The firm also developed the design standards for residential developments at the Deerwood Country Club and at Amelia Island Plantation north of Jacksonville. In Orlando, KBJ designed the First National Bank and Hartford Insurance buildings and three of the four airsides at Orlando International Airport; in Gainesville, the Delta Tau Delta fraternity house and Tigert Hall, the University of Florida Administration building; the Quarterdeck Club in Miami and the Occidental Life building in Raleigh.

History
Roy A. Benjamin (1888-1963) moved from Ocala to Jacksonville soon after the Great Fire of 1901 and designed many notable buildings in Jacksonville and surrounding areas. His most famous structures were theaters, although most of them have since been demolished. He was one of Jacksonville's most talented and prolific architects.

Three University of Florida alumni—William D. Kemp, Franklin S. Bunch and William K. Jackson—purchased Benjamin's architectural firm when he retired after World War II and renamed it Kemp, Bunch and Jackson in 1946. KBJ Architects has been in practice for more than 6 decades and is the oldest architectural firm in Florida. The company also maintains a branch office in downtown Orlando, Florida.

In June 2002, KBJ Architects, Rink Reynolds, Cannon Design and Spillis Candela were the final four candidates under consideration for designing the planned Duval County Courthouse Complex. When Cannon Design was chosen, KBJ appealed the award, claiming that Cannon's design was inconsistent with the specifications for size and budget set by the city, but the administration of Mayor John Delaney saw no grounds for the award to be rescinded. The project continued under Cannon into the term of Mayor John Peyton, but costs and the size of the project fluctuated and ultimately peaked at a $224 million construction cost, $23 million over the $201 million Mendoza Line for construction costs drawn by the Mayor. As a result, Peyton stopped all work on the project and terminated all consultants contracts for convenience, including Jacobs Facilities (Program Manager), Cannon (Architect) and construction managers Skanska Dynamic Partners.

The project was re-bid in 2006, and the City received two offers for a Design-Build solution and delivery of the project.  The team of Perry-McCall Construction -The Auchter Company coupled with Architects Rink Design and DLR were initially awarded the contract. When it was discovered that the Auchter Company had financial troubles, the contract was terminated for convenience. Second place bidder, Turner Construction Company, which is partnered with Technical Construction Services Group and KBJ Architects, was given an opportunity to negotiate a contract with the city in July 2007, by approval of the Competitive Sealed Proposal Evaluation Committee. A contract was signed with a budget of $350 million. Work was completed and the courthouse opened on June 18, 2012.

Founders
Each of the founders focused on one aspect of the firm, which worked out superbly. Kemp specialized in the business side of projects. Bunch was known for being the expert in the construction and technical aspects of architecture, and Jackson was the lead designer.

Franklin S. Bunch (1913-2008) served as president on a number of Florida boards and foundations, including the Florida State Board of Architecture, the Florida Association of Architects, and the Jacksonville Building Code Advisory Committee. He was also chairman of the Zoning and Building Codes Adjustment Board. and named an AIA Fellow in 1961.http://www.dcp.ufl.edu/files/004b4536-1461-4a09-9.pdf
William K. Jackson (1914-2003) was a strong believer in long-range urban planning and was a key supporter of 1962 legislation that created the Jacksonville-Duval Area Planning Board. He was chairman of the board that created Jacksonville's first downtown development plan.
William D. Kemp (1912-1982) was less outgoing that his other partners. According to his son, Kemp believed that architecture should remain pure, and not be directly involved with other construction industry activities. As such, he limited his outside activities to his church, where he was very active, serving as a Senior Warden and Vestryman.

Notable projects

Other significant buildings
KBJ designed buildings include:
Douglas Anderson School of the Arts
Fidelity National Financial buildings
Florida State College at Jacksonville Kent Campus
Jacksonville University administration building
Occidental Life Insurance Company Building in Raleigh, North Carolina
Omni Jacksonville Hotel
Physician Sales & Service offices
SuperStock offices
Riverside Presbyterian House
Tournament Players Club clubhouse (demolished)

Awards
Over the years, KBJ's projects have received scores of awards for excellence in Architecture, Design, Engineering and Renovations.
Franklin Bunch was elected a Fellow of the American Institute of Architects in 1961.
William K. Jackson was awarded the 1972 Architect Community Service Award by the Florida Association of the American Institute of Architects.
The company received a special award in 1992 from the Florida Association of the American Institute of Architects when KBJ Architects was named, Firm of the Year.

See also

Architecture of Jacksonville

References

External links
KBJ Architects, Inc. website
American Institute of Architects KBJ Architects member info
American Institute of Architects Jacksonville Chapter

Architecture firms based in Florida
Architecture firms based in Jacksonville
Companies based in Jacksonville, Florida
Design companies established in 1946
1946 establishments in Florida
Privately held companies based in Florida
Skyscraper architects
Jacksonville Modern architecture